St Philip's College is a private, coeducational school in Alice Springs, in the Northern Territory of Australia. St Philip's is a Uniting Church co-educational Boarding and Day School for students in Years 7 - 12. The school motto is 'To Strive, To Seek, To Care'.

The College is a member of the Round Square organisation and has a widely regarded Outdoor Education and Performing Arts program. St Philip's also performs well in overall academic results, with most students successfully obtaining NTCE and TER rankings. Notably,  Edward Tikoft, a senior student at St Philip's College, achieved the highest overall ranking out of all NTCE students in the state in 2008.

Facilities
The college is situated on a single campus (a short distance north of the Alice Springs town centre and ANZAC Hill). St Philip's facilities include The Minnamurra Hall, Bruce Reid Sports Centre with a rock climbing wall, one polished wooden basketball court (including volleyball adaptability), two other courts for the primary use of tennis and volleyball and a cricket net equipped with a bowling machine. Other facilities include the Swag Chapel, Fred McKay Education Centre, School Library and the brand new Science and Food Technology building which includes the Rivergum Cafe.

House system
Students are grouped into six different pastoral care "Houses" which compete throughout the year in Interschool sporting events, academic results and other such competitive events. The six houses are:

 McKay - Red
 Rolland - Yellow
 Flynn - Green
 Partridge - Maroon
 Griffiths - Blue
 Topsy Smith - Purple

References

External links
 St Philip's College Homepage
 St Philip's College Outdoor Education Homepage
 Round Square Homepage

Round Square schools
Boarding schools in Australia
Private secondary schools in the Northern Territory
Schools in Alice Springs
Educational institutions established in 1965
Uniting Church schools in Australia
1965 establishments in Australia

Location

Saint Philips is located next to an Aboriginal towncamp, commissioned by the Northern Territory government.